Pal or Gjergj Kastrioti was an Albanian medieval ruler in the latter part of the 14th century in northern Albania. Not much is known about his life. He is mentioned in only two historical sources which describe his rule as extending in a region between Mat and Dibër. His son was Gjon Kastrioti and his grandson Skanderbeg, the Albanian national hero.

In historiography 
A figure attested as Kastriot of Kanina in southern Albania who appears in a letter sent on September 2, 1368 by Alexander Komnenos Asen to the Ragusan senate has been hypothesized by a number of authors, mostly in the early 20th century, as an ancestor of the Kastrioti family. Heinrich Kretschmayr argued that this Kastriot may have been Pal Kastrioti, while John Fine considered it "probable" that this Kastriot was an ancestor of Gjon Kastrioti and Aleks Buda tried to bridge the geographical discrepancy with this theory, wherein Kastriot of Kanina lived in southern Albania while the Kastrioti were active in north-central Albania, by arguing that after the fall of the Balšić, they returned to their ancestral lands in the Dibër valley. In contemporary historiography, the figure recorded as Kastriot of Kanina in 1368 is considered to be unrelated to the Kastrioti family. The early Kastrioti so far remain absent from historical or archival records in comparison to other Albanian noble families until their first historical appearance.

The historical figure of Konstantin Kastrioti Mazreku is attested in Giovanni Andrea Angelo Flavio Comneno's Genealogia diversarum principum familiarum. Angelo mentions Kastrioti as Constantinus Castriotus, cognomento Meserechus, Aemathiae & Castoriae Princeps (Constantinus Castriotus, surnamed Meserechus, Prince of Aemathia and Castoria). Angelo used the cognomen Meserechus in reference to Skanderbeg and this link to the same name is produced in other sources and reproduced in later ones like Du Cange's Historia Byzantina (1680). These links highlight that the Kastrioti used Mazreku as a name that highlighted their tribal affiliation (farefisni). The name Mazrek(u), which means horse breeder in Albanian, is found throughout all Albanian regions.

Konstantin Kastrioti's son who was the father of Gjon Kastrioti and grandfather of Gjergj Kastrioti Skanderbeg appears in two historical sources, Gjon Muzaka's Breve memoria de li discendenti de nostra casa Musachi (1510) and Andrea Angelo's Genealogia diversarum principum familiarum (1603/1610) who was later largely reproduced by Du Cange (1680). Both works - like many contemporary publications about the lineages of nobility - are unreliable as self-contained sources. Angelo constructed ancient mythological lineages which linked renaissance figures to the age of Constantine the Great and Muzaka downplayed the importance of other Albanian feudal families, including the Kastrioti. Despite their historical value both sources are used in comparison to each other and other historical and contemporary research. Angelo calls Gjon Kastrioti's father "Georgius Castriotus" (Gjergj), lord (princeps) of "Aemathiae, Umenestria" (Mat and probably Ujmisht) and "Castoriae". This toponym has been interpreted as Kastriot, Kastrat in Has, Kastrat in Dibra or the microtoponym "Kostur" near the village of Mazrek in the Has region. Muzaka calls him "Paulo Castrioto" (Pal) and asserts that "he ruled over no more than two villages, called Signa and Gardi Ipostesi" (Sinë and Gardhi i Poshtëm, in Çidhën of Dibër). His first name is disputed. Angelo calls him "Georgius" (Gjergj) and Muzaka calls him "Paulo" (Pal). Neither name can be characterized as the correct version because of an extreme lack of sources. The name "Paulo" (Pal) is mentioned only by one author (Muzaka) and wasn't used as the name of any of his grandsons (Reposh, Konstantin, Stanisha, Gjergj) or great-grandsons (Giorgio, Costantino, Ferrante). 

His rule over "only two villages" as described by Muzaka has been disputed because if true, it would mean that his son, Gjon Kastrioti who ruled over a much larger area rose to power in the span of one generation. This is considered a very unlikely trajectory in the context of Albanian medieval society because noble families had acquired their area of influence over multiple generations in a complex system of affiliation with local village communities and intermarriage to each other. Historian Kristo Frashëri considers it likely that he ruled over his region "in the third quartier of the 14th century" between 1350-75 based on the fact that when his grandson Gjergj Kastrioti was born, his son Gjon had already fathered seven children.

References

Sources

 

14th-century births
Pal
14th-century rulers in Europe
14th-century Albanian people
Albanian Christians